Internal Medicine Journal is a medical journal published by Wiley.

Abstracting and indexing 
The journal is abstracted and indexed in:

 Abstracts in Anthropology (Sage)
 Abstracts in Social Gerontology (EBSCO Publishing)
 Abstracts on Hygiene & Communicable Diseases (CABI)
 Academic Search (EBSCO Publishing)
 Academic Search Alumni Edition (EBSCO Publishing)
 Academic Search Premier (EBSCO Publishing)
 BIOBASE: Current Awareness in Biological Sciences (Elsevier)
 Biological Abstracts (Clarivate Analytics)

According to the Journal Citation Reports, the journal has a 2021 impact factor of 2.611.

References

External links 

 
English-language journals
Publications with year of establishment missing

Internal medicine journals
Wiley-Blackwell academic journals